Liene Lutere (born 3 February 1976) is a Latvian rower. She competed in the women's double sculls event at the 1996 Summer Olympics.

References

1976 births
Living people
Latvian female rowers
Olympic rowers of Latvia
Rowers at the 1996 Summer Olympics
People from Cēsis